The Secret Society: Cecil John Rhodes's Plan for a New World Order is a 2015 book by Robin Brown.

Synopsis
The Secret Society examines Cecil Rhodes, his life and the secret society he founded with the ambition of bringing the world under British rule. The book suggests the society continued to have influence in British and world affairs, citing the Rhodes Scholarship and alleged links between the society and Chatham House and alleged influence on the peace terms to end World War I and appeasement of Hitler. The book draws on diaries and letters and also investigates and supports suggestions Rhodes was gay.

Reception
In the Mail & Guardian Shaun De Waal wrote that "In The Secret Society, Brown explores the enigma of Rhodes, delving into his homosexuality more deeply than any work on him so far and showing how Rhodes's dreams of an expanded British empire were codified early in his career" In Business Day Richard Steyn wrote "by challenging the conventional wisdom about Rhodes, The Secret Society provides a stimulating and thought-provoking read" but criticised the lack of a bibliography and the small number of references

The book was also reviewed in other sources such asNoseweek and The Star.

 Criticism 
Despite largely positive response in reviews, perhaps due to the (probably justified) assumption that powerful wealthy elites are indeed, shall we say, not as beneficent as one would hope, Ian Lulach Edwards has succinctly observed in a review'' that adequate - or even any - real references or citations are largely absent, leaving it as an academic, therefore factually reliable work, drastically wanting.

References

2015 non-fiction books
Books about imperialism
History books about Africa
History books about colonialism
Books about globalization
Penguin Books books